The 2011 Baltic Chain Tour was the inaugural modern era edition of the Baltic Chain Tour road cycling race. It was held over a period of four days between 17 and 20 May 2013. The race was a part of the 2012 UCI Europe Tour with a race classification of 2.2. General classification was won by Estonian cyclist Erki Pütsep.

Schedule

Classification leadership table

References

2011 UCI Europe Tour
2011 in Latvian sport
2011 in Estonian sport
2011 in Lithuanian sport
Baltic Chain Tour